The McDonnell XV-1 is an experimental Convertiplane developed by McDonnell Aircraft for a joint research program between the United States Air Force and the United States Army to explore technologies to develop an aircraft that could take off and land like a helicopter but fly at faster airspeeds, similar to a conventional airplane.

Development

In 1951, the Air Force announced a competition to develop a compound helicopter, an aircraft that could take off and land vertically, like a helicopter, but could cruise at higher airspeeds than conventional helicopters. The joint research program was being conducted by the Air Force's Research and Development Command and the Army's Transportation Corps. Bell Aircraft submitted the design for the XV-3, Sikorsky Aircraft submitted the S-57, a retracting rotor design, and McDonnell submitted a design modified from its Model M-28 design.

On 20 June 1951, the Air Force and Army signed a Letter of Intent with McDonnell to award a contract to develop an aircraft based on their design. McDonnell benefited from previous design work on the Model M-28 and had a complete mockup ready for inspection by the Army and Air Force by November 1951. McDonnell was given approval to begin fabrication of what was then designated the XL-25 ("L" for Liaison). As the aircraft was being constructed the designation was changed to XH-35. Finally, the aircraft became the first vehicle in the convertiplane series as the XV-1.

The basic airframe came from an early post-World War II commercial airplane program for a four-place airplane in the Bonanza and Navion class. McDonnell enlisted Kurt Hohenemser and Friedrich von Doblhoff, the Austrian helicopter designer of the WNF 342, to provide technical direction in developing the tip-jet driven rotor system. After 22 months of fabrication, the first aircraft (serial 53-4016) was ready for flight testing by early 1954.

Design

Built mostly from aluminum, the XV-1 fuselage consisted of a streamlined tube mounted on skid landing gear, with a rear-mounted engine and a pusher propeller. It also had tapered stub wings mounted high on the fuselage. In turn, twin tailbooms and twin vertical surfaces, interconnected by a horizontal stabilizer elevator, were mounted to the wings. A three-bladed main rotor powered by blade tip pressure jets was mounted on top of the fuselage, above the wing roots.

The convertiplane featured a single Continental-built R-975 radial piston engine that powered twin air compressors. These forced high-pressure air through piping in the rotor blades to a combustion chamber on each of the three rotor tips, where a burner ignited fuel for increased thrust, which drove the rotors around and allowed the aircraft to fly like a conventional helicopter.
For horizontal flight, the engine was disconnected from the compressors and drove the two-bladed pusher propeller instead. During forward flight the wing provided 80% of the lift with the remainder generated by the main rotor autorotating at about 50% of normal rpm. When in hover mode, the rotor turned at 410 RPM but slowed to 180 RPM for high-speed flight above .

The cabin was covered almost entirely with Plexiglas windows providing visibility in all directions except directly underneath the aircraft. The cockpit consisted of tandem pilot and copilot stations, or the aircraft could accommodate a pilot and three passengers, or a pilot and two stretchers.

Operational history

The XV-1 began tethered hovering flight tests on 11 February 1954, with test pilot John R. Noll. The tether had lead weights intended to keep the aircraft in ground effect until issues with the rotor's tip-jet propulsion system were solved. On 14 July 1954, the lead weights were removed and the XV-1 conducted its first free hovering flight. As flight testing continued, McDonnell completed the second machine (s/n 53-4017).

The second aircraft was modified from the original XV-1 in an attempt to reduce parasitic drag during high-speed forward flight. To achieve this end, the rotor pylon was reduced and the undercarriage was streamlined as well as strengthened. The second XV-1 also featured two small tail rotors mounted on the outboard side at the end of each tailboom. These were a result of the hover test flights by Noll who remarked on the lack of yaw authority when using rudders only. The original XV-1 would later be modified with the tail rotors.

By the spring of 1955, the second XV-1 was ready to join the flight program. On 29 April 1955, the XV-1 made its first transition from vertical to horizontal flight, and on 10 October 1955, the second XV-1 became the first rotorcraft to exceed , nearly  faster than the helicopter speed record at the time. The XV-1 achieved a mu (the ratio of airspeed to rotor tip speed) of 0.95.

After three years and nearly 600 hours between the two aircraft, the XV-1 contract was canceled in 1957. Ultimately, it was determined that the XV-1's convertiplane configuration was too complex for the small advantages gained over conventional helicopters. The piston engine could not produce enough power to optimize the design advantages. Technological advances in conventional helicopter rotor design and engines in the following years would eventually negate the XV-1's performance margin. McDonnell would try to capitalize on the tip-jet rotor technology with a small crane helicopter design, designated Model 120 and first flown on 13 November 1957.

Surviving aircraft

The Army retained 53-4016, which was transferred to the United States Army Aviation Museum at Fort Rucker, Alabama. 53-4017, the record-setting, second prototype, was donated by the Army to the Smithsonian Institution's National Air and Space Museum, Washington, D.C. in 1964.

Specifications (XV-1)

See also

References

Notes

Bibliography

 Connor, R. and R. E. Lee. McDonnell XV-1 Convertiplane. 24 September 2001. Smithsonian National Air and Space Museum, Washington, DC. Accessed 4 December 2007.
 Donald, David. The Complete Encyclopedia of World Aircraft. New York: Barnes & Noble Books, 1997. .
 Francillon, René J. McDonnell Douglas Aircraft since 1920: Volume II. London: Putnam, 1997. .
 Harding, Stephen. U.S. Army Aircraft Since 1947 An Illustrated Reference. Schiffer military/aviation history. Atglen, PA: Schiffer Pub, 1997. .
 Markman, Steve, and William G. Holder. Straight Up A History of Vertical Flight. Schiffer military/aviation history. Atglen, PA: Schiffer Pub, 2000. .
 Robb, Raymond L. Hybrid helicopters: Compounding the quest for speed, Vertiflite. Summer 2006. American Helicopter Society.
 Harris, Franklin D. An Overview of Autogyros and the McDonnell XV–1 Convertiplane NASA, 2003. Mirror1, Mirror2. Size: 284 pages in 13MB

External links

 McDonnell XV-1 XV-1 Convertiplane on Smithsonian National Air and Space Museum' site
 XV-1 page on GlobalSecurity.org
 XV-1 page on vstol.org
 Early McDonnell Helicopters on AirandSpaceMuseum.org

Rotorcraft
Gyrodynes
1950s United States helicopters
XV-1
Single-engined pusher aircraft
Slowed rotor
Aircraft first flown in 1954
High-wing aircraft
Tipjet-powered helicopters